Velopoula (Greek: Βελοπούλα) is an island situated to the southeast of Spetses, which is one of the Saronic Islands, in the Greek region of Attica and the Aegean Sea. It is the site of a lighthouse.

References

Saronic Islands